Pterostylis incognita, commonly known as the Sale greenhood,  is a plant in the orchid family Orchidaceae and is endemic to Victoria. It has a rosette of leaves and when flowering, up to twelve crowded flowers on a stem with a rosette at the base. The type specimen was collected near Sale in 1895 but was not formally described or given a name until 2009, by which time it was presumed extinct.

Description
Pterostylis incognita, is a terrestrial,  perennial, deciduous, herb with an underground tuber. The galea is erect near its base then gradually curves with the tip suddenly turning downwards. Flowering occurs from September to October.

Taxonomy and naming
The Sale greenhood was first formally described in 2009 by David Jones and given the name Hymenochilus incognitus from a specimen collected near Sale in 1895 by Miss M. Wise. The description was published in The Orchadian. In 2010 Gary Backhouse changed the name to Pterosylis incognita. The specific epithet (incognita) is a Latin word meaning "unknown".

Distribution and habitat
Pterostylis incognita probably grew in grassland or in grassy forest near Sale.

Conservation
No scientific collections of this species have been made for more than one hundred years and it is presumed to be extinct.

References

incognita
Endemic orchids of Australia
Orchids of Victoria (Australia)
Plants described in 2009
Extinct plants